Heliconia indica is a species of plant in the family Heliconiaceae. It is found in Maluku and the southwest Pacific.

Names
Heliconia indica is reconstructed as *rako in the Proto-Eastern Oceanic language, the reconstructed ancestor of the Eastern Oceanic languages.

References

Flora of the Pacific
indica